Mirza Abu Talib (22 November 1600 – 1694), better known as Shaista Khan, was a general and the subahdar of Mughal Bengal. A maternal uncle to the emperor Aurangzeb, he acted as a key figure during his reign. Shaista Khan initially governed the Deccan, where he clashed with the Maratha Ruler Chatrapati Shivaji Maharaj. However, he was most notable for his tenure as the governor of Bengal from 1664 to 1688. Under Shaista Khan's authority, the city of Dhaka and Mughal power in the province attained its greatest heights. His achievements include constructions of notable mosques such as the Sat Gambuj Mosque and masterminding the conquest of Chittagong. Shaista Khan was also responsible for sparking the outbreak of the Anglo-Mughal War with the English East India Company.

Early life
According to the diary of William Hedges, the first governor of the East India Company in Bengal, the birthday of Shaista Khan was on 22 November.

Khan was of Persian origin. His grandfather Mirza Ghiyas Beg and father Abu'l-Hasan Asaf Khan were the wazirs of the Mughal emperors Jahangir and Shah Jahan, respectively. He also had familial connections with the imperial dynasty, having been a paternal nephew of the empress Nur Jahan and the brother of the empress Mumtaz Mahal. Jahangir awarded the title of Mirza to Shaista Khan in recognition of his family's service and position in the Mughal court.

Khan trained and served with the Mughal army and court, winning multiple promotions and being appointed governor of various provinces. He also developed a reputation as a successful military commander and grew close to his nephew, the prince Aurangzeb, when the duo fought against the kingdom of Golconda.

Confrontation with the Marathas

After Aurangzeb's accession to the Mughal throne in 1659, he sent Shaista Khan as viceroy of the Deccan with a large army to enforce the treaty the Mughals had signed with the Adilshahi of Bijapur. Through the treaty the Adilshahi had ceded territory that it had previously captured from the Ahmadnagar Sultanate, to the Mughals. However, the territory was also fiercely contested by Maratha ruler, Shivaji who had acquired a reputation after his killing of Adilshahi general, Afzal Khan in 1659. In January 1660, Shaista Khan arrived at Aurangabad and quickly advanced, seizing Pune, the centre of Shivaji's realm. He also captured the fort of Chakan and Kalyan and north Konkan after heavy fighting with the Marathas. Shaista Khan camped at Lal Mahal, Palace in Pune where Chhatrapati Shivaji Maharaj spent his childhood. The Maratha were banned from entering the city of Pune and Mughal distance from the locals turned out to be an error. On the evening of 5 April 1663, a wedding party had obtained special permission for holding a procession. Shivaji and many of his nearly 400 men disguised as the bridegroom's procession members entered Pune. Others entered in small parties dressed as labourers and soldiers of Maratha generals serving under Shaista Khan. After midnight, they raided the Nawab's compound and then entered the palace in an attempt to assassinate him.

The Marathas broke into the courtyard of the palace and slaughtered the palace guards. The Nawab lost three fingers in a skirmish with Shivaji, while his son who was getting married was killed in an encounter with the Marathas in the palace courtyard. Taking advantage of the confusion and darkness, the Marathas escaped the palace and Pune, despite the widespread camping of Mughal forces. Shocked by the sudden and bold terror attack in the city, Aurangzeb angrily transferred Shaista Khan to Bengal, even refusing to give him audience at the time of transfer as was the custom.

Subahdar of Bengal

On the death of Mir Jumla II in 1663, Shaista Khan was appointed the Subedar of Bengal. As governor, he encouraged trade with Europe, Southeast Asia and other parts of India. He consolidated his power by signing trade agreements with European powers. Despite his powerful position he remained loyal to Aurangzeb, often mediating trade disputes and rivalries. He banned the English East India Company from Bengal in 1686, beginning the Anglo-Mughal War. In 1678, Prince Muhammad Azam Shah was appointed the Subedar of Bengal. In 1680, Shaista Khan was again appointed as the Subedar of Bengal. He served his first term from 1663 to 1678 and his second term from 1680 to 1688.

Construction projects
Shaista Khan encouraged the construction of modern townships and public works in Dhaka, leading to a massive urban and economic expansion. He was a patron of the arts and encouraged the construction of majestic monuments across the province, including mosques, mausoleums and palaces that represented the finest in Indo-Sarcenic and Mughal architecture. Khan greatly expanded Lalbagh Fort, Chowk Bazaar Mosque, Saat Masjid and Choto Katra. He also supervised the construction of the mausoleum for his daughter Bibi Pari.

Conquest of Chittagong 

Upon his arrival in Bengal, Shaista Khan was faced with putting down the Arakanese pirates. He began by rebuilding the Mughal navy, increasing its Bengal fleet to 300 battle-ready ships within a year. He also made strenuous diplomatic efforts to win the support of the Dutch East India Company as well as Portugal, which was supporting Arakan with resources and troops. With active Dutch military support, Shaista Khan led Mughal forces on an assault on the island of Sandwip, which lay in Arakanese control. Mughal forces succeeded in capturing the island in November 1665.

Shaista Khan gained a considerable advantage when a conflict erupted between the Arakanese and the Portuguese. The Portuguese, led by Captain Moor, set fire to Arakanese fleets and fled to Bhulua where Thanadar Farhad Khan gave them refuge. Farhad then sent them off to Shaista. By promptly offering protection and support, Shaista secured the aid of the Portuguese against the Arakanese.

In December 1665, Shaista Khan launched a major military campaign against Chittagong, which was the mainstay of the Arakanese kingdom. The imperial fleet consisted of 288 vessels of their own and about 40 vessels of the Firingis (Portuguese) as auxiliaries. Ibn Hussain, Shaista Khan's admiral, was asked to lead the navy, while the subahdar himself took up the responsibility of supplying provisions for the campaign. He also ordered Farhad Khan and Mir Murtaza to take the land route. The overall command was given to Buzurg Ummed Khan, a son of Shaista Khan. The Mughals and the Portuguese held sway in the following naval battle. The conquered territory to the western bank of Kashyapnadi (Kaladan river) was placed under direct imperial administration. The name of Chittagong was changed to Islamabad and it became the headquarters of a Mughal faujdar. Khan also re-asserted Mughal control over Cooch Behar and Kamarupa.

Upon his victory against the Arakanese, he ordered the release of thousands of Bengali peasants being held captive by the Arakanese forces.

Personal life
Khan became father of a son on 12 November 1682.

Legacy
In his late years, Shaista Khan left Dhaka and returned to Delhi. His legacy was the expansion of Dhaka into a regional centre of trade, politics and culture; a thriving and prosperous city from a small township. It is said that he made currency of Bangladesh 'Taka' so strong that eight 'mon' (around 295 kilogram) processed rice or 'chaal' could be bought with one taka.
The Shaista Khan Mosque is a massive standing monument to Shaista Khan, built on his palace grounds. Incorporating unique elements of Bengali and Mughal architecture, it is a major tourist attraction and a valued historical monument protected by the Government of Bangladesh today.

See also
 List of rulers of Bengal
 History of Dhaka

References

 
 

1600 births
1694 deaths
Mughal nobility
17th-century Iranian military personnel
Indian people of Iranian descent
Indian Shia Muslims
Dhaka
Subahdars of Bengal